Life on Mars is a South Korean television series based on the 2006–07 British series of the same name. It stars Jung Kyung-ho, Park Sung-woong, Go Ah-sung, Oh Dae-hwan and Noh Jong-hyun. The series aired on OCN from June 9 to August 5, 2018 on Saturdays and Sundays at 22:20 (KST).

Synopsis
Han Tae-joo (Jung Kyung-Ho) leads a crime investigation team. He has experienced a rapid rise in his career and he trusts data over people. While investigating a serial murder case, he has an accident. When Han Tae-joo wakes up, he finds himself in 1988. He does not know why, but he is now a detective appointed to work at a police station in a small city. To get back to the present day, Han Tae-joo tries to solve a serial murder case.

Cast

Main
 Jung Kyung-ho as Han Tae-joo 
A modern-day forensics scientist who travels back to the past and became a detective. He is a brilliant, principled individual who prefers to rely on scientific data and evidence rather than people.
 Park Sung-woong as Kang Dong-chul
Head of the Homicide Team. A detective who is uninterested in evidence and instead uses his keen instincts and intuition to solve his cases.
 Go Ah-sung as Yoon Na-young 
A passionate ace investigator who dreams of becoming a star detective.
 Oh Dae-hwan as Lee Yong-gi
A police sergeant in the homicide unit. He is described as unhinged and with a nasty temper.
 Noh Jong-hyun as Jo Nam-sik
The youngest detective on the team.

Recurring
 Jeon Seok-ho as Han Choong-Ho the father of Han Tae-Joo
 Kim Jae-kyung as Han Mal-sook
 Kim Dae-gon as Park Byung-doo	
 Lee Bong-ryun as Yoo Soon-hee
 Kim Young-pil as Kim Myung-se 
An elite head detective who cares more about his appearance than investigations.
 Lee Ji-ha as Han Mal-sook	
 Yoo Yeon as Lee Sun-ja
 Lee Hee-won as Han Tae-joo 
 Kim Ki-cheon as Manager Park
 Oh Ah-rin as Young-joo
 Choi Seung-yoon as Kim Min Seok (2018 - serial killer)
 Oh Han-kyul as child Kim Min-seok (1988)

Special appearance
 Park Gyu-young as Daughter
 Moon Woo-jin as Kyung Ho (Ep. 6)
 Joo Suk-tae as Lee Kang Heon, 1988 - escaped prisoner & hostage-taker (Ep. 7)
 Hong Kyung as "E.T." / Oh Young Soo [1988] (Ep. 10,12)
 Moon Sook as Kim Mi-yeon - Tae Joo's mother [2018] (Ep. 15-16)
Jeon Hye-bin as Jung Seo-hyun, Tae-joo’s fiancee and prosecutor

Production
 First script reading took place on March 12, 2018 at Studio Dragon in Sangam-dong. 
 Im Chang-jung was offered a major supporting role but he declined the offer. 
 Seo Ji-hoon was cast in the role of Jo Nam-sik but dropped out of the project.

Original soundtrack

Part 1

Part 2

Part 3

Ratings

Awards and nominations

International broadcast
The drama was broadcast on tvN Asia with subtitles in Hong Kong, Singapore, Taiwan, Malaysia, the Philippines, Indonesia, Thailand, Myanmar and Sri Lanka where it premiered on October, 2019.

References

External links
  
 Life on Mars at Studio Dragon 
 
 

Life on Mars (franchise)
South Korean television series based on British television series
OCN television dramas
Korean-language television shows
2018 South Korean television series debuts
2018 South Korean television series endings
South Korean crime television series
South Korean time travel television series
Television series set in 1988
Television series set in 2018
Television series by Studio Dragon